Veľká Lesná, formerly Richvald (Goral: Ryvold) a village and municipality in Stará Ľubovňa District in the Prešov Region of northern Slovakia.

History
In historical records the village was first mentioned in 1338.

Before the dissolution of Austria-Hungary, the town was listed as Richvald.

Geography
The municipality lies at an altitude of 620 metres and covers an area of 24.256 km². It has a population of about 494 people.

External links
https://web.archive.org/web/20080111223415/http://www.statistics.sk/mosmis/eng/run.html 
https://www.youtube.com/watch?v=byFDw_nqdas Video that captures Velka Lesna's relationship to East Douglas, USA

Villages and municipalities in Stará Ľubovňa District